Tony Goodchild is a former Australian rules footballer who played for Sturt in the South Australian National Football League (SANFL).  According to Jeff Pash, Goodchild was "the hardiest marker of them all. He gets grimly to that front position, sets himself, and stays there. Strength, with that characteristic habit of determination, does it".  In 1959, Goodchild was awarded the T.S. O'Halloran Trophy as best on ground for South Australia against Victoria.

Following retirement from Sturt, Goodchild shifted to Hahndorf for one season, where he was a member of their 1963 Hills Central Football Association Premiership.

References

External links 

Sturt Football Club players
Australian rules footballers from South Australia
Living people
Year of birth missing (living people)